Koggala Marakkalage Pradeep Chirantha de Silva (born 1 April 1988) is a Sri Lankan cricketer. He is a left-handed batsman and wicket-keeper who played for Seeduwa Raddoluwa. He was born in Colombo.

De Silva made his cricketing debut in the 2008 Under-23 Tournament, playing seven matches in the competition in total.

De Silva's debut first-class appearance came during the 2008–09 season, against Singha Sports Club. He played eight matches during the competition, making a top score of 32 runs against Burgher Recreation Club.

De Silva played eight matches during the 2008-09 Premier Limited Overs Tournament, scoring 117 runs, including one of only two half-centuries achieved by the team in that season's competition.

References

External links
Chirantha de Silva at Cricket Archive 

1988 births
Living people
Sri Lankan cricketers
Seeduwa Raddoluwa Cricket Club cricketers
Cricketers from Colombo